The Last Ship is an original musical with music and lyrics by Sting and a book by 
Lorne Campbell. 

Following a UK national tour and subsequent six-week run at the Princess of Wales Theatre in Toronto, it embarked on a US national tour with the official opening at the Ahmanson Theatre, Los Angeles on 22 January 2020. Inspired by Sting's own childhood experiences and the shipbuilding industry in Wallsend, Tyne and Wear, an earlier version of the musical with book by John Logan and Brian Yorkey played at the Bank of America Theatre in Chicago, before moving to the Neil Simon Theatre on Broadway in 2014. The musical received two Tony Award nominations in 2015, for Best Original Score and Best Orchestrations.

Premise 
The Last Ship was initially inspired by Sting's 1991 album The Soul Cages and Sting's own childhood experiences, particularly his relationship with his father who had been an engineer in a family of shipwrights. It tells the story about community and the demise of the shipbuilding industry in Wallsend, Tyne and Wear, with the closure of the town's Swan Hunter shipyard. "I did everything in my power to escape Wallsend... I became successful, but I owe a debt to that community. This play is me trying to honour that community, trying to pay back what they gave me -- a sense of self but also the engine that allowed me to escape. That's the strange paradox. I love where I come from, I'm glad I escaped, at the same time I need to tell that story as a sort of 'soul debt'."

Production history
In September 2011, it was confirmed that British musician Sting was working on a musical, following rumours the previous year. A first reading took place in Manhattan in October that year, with a further reading in Newcastle in February 2012 and ultimately a full staged reading for the musical was held in 2013. In September 2013, the show was officially confirmed and it was announced that the show would premiere in Chicago in 2014. 

The show has a book by John Logan and Brian Yorkey and is directed by Joe Mantello, with choreography by Steven Hoggett, set and costume design by David Zinn, lighting design by Christopher Akerlind and sound design by Brian Ronan.

The show features a score by Sting that includes mostly original material, as well as four previously-written songs: "Island of Souls" and "All This Time" from The Soul Cages, "When We Dance" from the 1994 album Fields of Gold: The Best of Sting 1984–1994, and "Ghost Story" from the 1999 album Brand New Day. Speaking in 2011, Brian Yorkey said: "He's writing great theater music... It's very, very distinctly Sting but it also is theatre music. It's not just pop music transposed into the theatre."

The Last Ship is Sting's first stage musical. He had previously co-written the score for the 2000 animated Disney musical film The Emperor's New Groove, although only two of his songs ended up in the film after heavy studio retooling.
 
Sting's eleventh studio album, titled The Last Ship, featuring music from, or originally intended for the musical, was released on 24 September 2013. The album marked his first release of original material since his 2003 album Sacred Love and his first foray into musical theatre. Sting had suffered from writer's block and credited the show with giving him a reason to write songs again. Sting held a series of concerts at The Public Theater in October 2013, featuring music from the show and told stories of the making of the musical. The concert was later broadcast on PBS as part of its Great Performances series.

After the "unsurprising" closure of the Broadway run of the show, many observers commented that Newcastle or another venue in the UK would have been "a more natural home" for the show, which was "a tough sell" for the US. "Tyneside accents and the decline of Britain’s industrial heartland aren’t naturally in the wheelhouse of Manhattan’s jewellery-rattling theatregoers." Sting has been dismissive of the argument.

The musical was produced later in the UK, with a new book. One of the major changes in the new production was the removal of the significant figure of a priest, as well as many religious references.

Roles and principal casts

Sting replaced Nail as Jackie White from 9 December 2014 until the show's Broadway closing on 25 January 2015.
Since the 2018 UK tour production, the roles of Joe Fletcher and Freddy Newlands have been played by the same actor.

Music

Musical numbers
The following is the list of musical numbers in the Broadway production. The musical uses a twelve-member orchestra consisting of keyboard, piano, guitar, bass, drums, Northumbrian smallpipe, flute, whistle, melodeon, fiddle, cello and percussion.

Act l
"Island of Souls" – Jackie White, Young Gideon, Peggy White, Father O'Brien, Young Meg, Company
"All This Time" – Gideon Fletcher
"August Winds" – Meg Dawson, Young Meg
"Shipyard" – Jackie White, Billy Thompson, Peggy White, Father O'Brien, Company
"If You Ever See Me Talking to a Sailor" – Meg Dawson, Women
"Dead Man's Boots" – Gideon Fletcher, Joe Fletcher, Young Gideon
"The Last Ship (Part One)" – Father O'Brien
"Sail Away" – Peggy White
"The Last Ship (Part Two)" – Jackie White, Father O'Brien, Company
"What Say You, Meg?" – Arthur Millburn
"We've Got Now't Else" – Jackie White, Davy Harrison, Billy Thompson, Tom Dawson, Shipyard Men
"When We Dance" – Gideon Fletcher, Meg Dawson, Arthur Millburn
"The Last Ship (Reprise)" – Gideon Fletcher, Jackie White, Father O'Brien, Company

Act ll
"Mrs. Dees' Rant" – Mrs. Dees, Women
"The Night the Pugilist Learned How to Dance" – Gideon Fletcher, Tom Dawson
"We've Got Now't Else (Reprise)" – Jackie White, Gideon Fletcher, Company
"So to Speak" – Father O'Brien, Gideon Fletcher
"Hymn" – Company
"Show Some Respect" – Peggy White, Gideon Fletcher, Jackie White, Meg Dawson, Company
"Island of Souls (Reprise)" – Meg Dawson, Young Gideon, Young Meg, Gideon Fletcher
"It's Not the Same Moon" – Gideon Fletcher, Meg Dawson
"Underground River" – Jackie White, Tom Dawson, Company
"Ghost Story" – Gideon Fletcher, Tom Dawson
"August Winds (Reprise)" – Gideon Fletcher, Tom Dawson
"The Last Ship (Finale)" – Company

Toronto (2019)

Act l
"In the Morning" – Company
"We've Got Now't Else (Overture)" – Jackie White and Company
"Island of Souls" – Company
"And Yet" – Gideon Fletcher and Ferryman
"Shipyard" – Jackie White, Billy Thompson, Adrian Sanderson, Peggy White, Davey Harrison and Company
"Sail Away" – Peggy White
"If You Ever See Me Talking to a Sailor" – Meg Dawson and the women of the Company
"Underground River" – Billy Thompson and Company
"Underground River (Reprise)" – Billy Thompson and Company
"Dead Man's Boots" – Gideon Fletcher, Old Joe Fletcher and Young Gideon
"When the Pugilist Learned to Dance" – Gideon Fletcher and Ellen Dawson
"August Winds" – Meg Dawson
"The Last Ship (Part One)" – Jackie White, Peggy White, Davey Harrison and Company

Act ll
"Mrs. Dees' Rant" – Mrs. Dees and the Women of the Company
"It's Not the Same Moon" – Meg Dawson and Ellen Dawson
"All This Time" – Ellen Dawson
"So to Speak" – Jackie White and Peggy White
"What Say You Meg?" – Gideon Fletcher and Meg Dawson
"The Last Ship (Reprise)" – Jackie White and Company
"Hadaway (Out of Your Tiny Minds)" – Davey Harrison and Company
"Underground River (Reprise)" – Peggy White and Jackie White
"When We Danced" – Gideon Fletcher and Meg Dawson
"We've Got Now't Else (Reprise)" – Peggy White and Company
"Show Some Respect" – Peggy White and Company
"The Last Ship (Finale)" – Company

Original Broadway cast album

The original Broadway cast recording was released on 16 December 2014.

Productions

Chicago and Broadway
On 19 September 2013, it was announced that the show would begin its world premiere with a pre-Broadway Chicago tryout. Tickets for the tryout went on sale on 14 February 2014. Previews for the Chicago run of the show began on 10 June 2014 at the Bank of America Theatre, the show opened on 25 June 2014, and played for 33 days total until 13 July 2014.

Following completion of the tryout in Chicago, The Last Ship transferred to the Neil Simon Theatre on Broadway in New York. Previews started playing at the Neil Simon Theater on 29 September 2014, and the official opening night was 26 October 2014. Sting joined the cast on stage during the curtain call on opening night. Celebrities including Billy Joel, Robert De Niro and Liam Neeson were in attendance. In a bid to help falling ticket sales, creator and musician Sting joined the cast for a limited run from 9 December 2014 to 24 January 2015, replacing Jimmy Nail.

Despite sales increasing with Sting in the cast and producers stating he had had a "galvanising effect", the decision was made to close the show on 24 January 2015.

Salt Lake City
The Last Ship was produced in Salt Lake City, Utah at the Roy W. and Elizabeth E. Simmons Pioneer Memorial Theatre at the University of Utah campus from 16 September 2016 through 1 October 2016, making its regional premiere in Salt Lake City in the first production after its Broadway run.

On 22 September, Sting joined the cast at the curtain call of that evening's performance, After a standing ovation, Sting thanked the "amazing cast" and said it was "surreal" to see the story of his English shipbuilding home transported to the middle of Utah.

"I loved the reaction," he said. "I loved sitting among you all and hearing you laugh and hearing you cry."

Turku, Finland 
A new (non-replica) production of The Last Ship (fin. Viimeinen Laiva) opened in Turku, Finland, on 15 September 2017 at Turku City Theatre. The full show was performed in the Finnish language. Turku is a very famous shipbuilding city in Finland. One of the world's biggest cruise ships, the Royal Caribbean Oasis of the Seas, was built at the Turku shipyard.

United Kingdom and Ireland

In October 2017, it was announced The Last Ship would be embark on a UK and Ireland tour, beginning at Northern Stage in Newcastle upon Tyne 12 March 2018, closing 7 July 2018 at Lyric Theatre, part of The Lowry in Salford. The production features a new book by director Lorne Campbell. Notable casting included Joe McGann as Jackie White, Richard Fleeshman as Gideon Fletcher, Charlie Hardwick as Peggy White and Francess McNamee as Meg Dawson. Jimmy Nail had been due to reprise the role he created on Broadway of Jackie White, however negotiations stalled and his offer to perform on the tour was withdrawn.

Toronto
The show ran in Toronto, Ontario, at the Princess of Wales Theatre between 9 February and 24 March 2019. The production featured a new cast, including Sting as Jackie White.

US tour
The US tour of The Last Ship debuted on January 22 at the Ahmanson Theater in Los Angeles. The musical then moved to San Francisco, opening on February 25 at the Golden Gate Theatre. The US tour, however, was then suspended due to the COVID-19 pandemic. The tour was scheduled to stop in  Washington, DC, Minneapolis, and Detroit through April 2020.

Germany
The Theatre of West Pomerania and Theater Koblenz rescheduled their productions of The Last Ship in 2021 after the 2020 versions were cancelled due to the COVID-19 pandemic. 
The Theatre Lübeck had Premiere of their production, fully in German on the 11th of February 2022.

Awards

References

External links

2014 musicals
Broadway musicals
Musicals inspired by real-life events
Original musicals
Plays set in the 20th century
Plays set in England
Sting (musician)
Wallsend